Denis Fernand Py (1887–1949) was a French sculptor, medal artist and engraver that created highly stylized medals with religious themes during his career.

An example of his work is that of St. Patrick, Apostle of Ireland. Rather than depicting the typical elder man with a long beard wearing a Catholic priest chasuble and bishop's mitre carrying a shepherd's staff and pointing at snakes (or holding a sharock), Py changed up the image. In Py's version of St. Patrick, the saint's body parts are not in proportion. His right hand shows the saint extending his middle and index fingers of the right hand (as in a sign for peace or victory). The depiction continues to wear the bishop's mitre and carries the shepherd's staff. The Py St. Patrick, though wears a button down cassock and cape as one might see an Anglican bishop wear. While the Py St. Patrick does not hold a shamrock (a symbol used to teach about the Triune God), but one is placed prominently nearby on the medal. The Patrick on this medal is beardless. In one corner of the medal are towers as one might assume Patrick envisioned in Armagh. Finally, around the image is the name of St. Patrick. It is not written in the vernacular, but in Latin (as Patrick spoke). Around the image, Py wrote "Sanctus Patricius" with letters that do not match in size.

References

1887 births
1949 deaths